Australia vs Fiji in rugby league is a rivalry between the Australia national rugby league team and the Fiji national rugby league team in the sport of rugby league. The first match between the two sides was in 1995, with the Kangaroos coming out with a 66–0 victory. They have played each other six times, all at consecutive World Cups, with Australia winning each match-up by at least 32 points.

Head to Head

Results

2010s

2000s

1990s

References

External links 

 Australia vs Fiji – Rugby League Project

Rugby league rivalries
Australia national rugby league team
Fiji national rugby league team
Sports rivalries in Australia